Giuseppe Biasi (Sassari, 1885 – Andorno Micca (Biella), 1945) was an Italian painter.

Biography
While pursuing classical studies in accordance with his family’s wishes, Biasi became well known in his hometown for caricatures published in local humorous journals when he was still very young. His drawings kept up to date with the latest French and above all Mitteleuropean models and achieved considerable success also beyond the national borders. He contributed to the most important Italian magazines of the period, including L’illustrazione italiana, Avanti della Domenica and Il Giornalino della Domenica, and finally established himself as the illustrator of Grazia Deledda, with whom he shared a determination to assert the specific values of Sardinian culture in post-unification Italy. He also began painting, primarily folkloristic depictions of his homeland but informed by an awareness of the latest developments in European painting, with which he came into contact very early through the shows of the Secessione Romana movement and the Venice Biennale, where he made his debut at the Esposizione Internazionale d’Arte della Città di Venezia in 1909. Participation in exhibitions in Rome and Milan was interrupted only for the short period when he served as a volunteer in World War I. The period 1924–26 saw a number of journeys to North Africa in search of ways to revitalise his means of expression. An interest in decoration and experimentation with mosaic and fresco techniques developed in the 1940s.

References
 Elena Lissoni, Giuseppe Biasi , online catalogue Artgate by Fondazione Cariplo, 2010, CC BY-SA (source for the first revision of this article).

Other projects

19th-century Italian painters
Italian male painters
20th-century Italian painters
People from Sassari
1885 births
1945 deaths
Italian military personnel of World War I
19th-century Italian male artists
20th-century Italian male artists